Acheritou ( []) is a village in Cyprus, located just to the west of the Agios Nikolaos section of Dhekelia SBA. De facto, it is part of Northern Cyprus. In 2011, its population was 911.

References

Communities in Famagusta District
Populated places in Gazimağusa District
Greek Cypriot villages depopulated during the 1974 Turkish invasion of Cyprus